Thrifty Foods (often shortened to Thrifty's) is a chain of supermarkets located in British Columbia, Canada.

Background 

Thrifty Foods was founded by Alex Campbell and Ernie Skinner in 1977 when the first store was opened in Victoria's Fairfield neighbourhood. , the chain operates 25 stores, with 2 more under construction on Vancouver Island and the Lower Mainland. It is the largest supermarket chain on Vancouver Island. In 2007 it became a division of Sobeys which operated independently of the larger company initially, before being fully integrated.

Since 2004, it has operated an on-line grocery service on Vancouver Island. The online ordering system extends into the Metro Vancouver area.

The company has an annual scholarship program that gives out $1500 to 20 students that are part of the company's web, either directly or indirectly.

Thrifty Foods is the largest private employer on Vancouver Island. In 1999, Thrifty Foods was voted among the Ten Best Companies to Work For in British Columbia. In 2007, Thrifty Foods was recognized as one of Canada's 50 Best Managed Companies.

On April 14, 2014, Overwaitea Food Group took over three Thrifty Foods locations including Brooks Landing in Nanaimo, Abbotsford, and Sapperton at New Westminster via an acquisition to ensure that Sobeys does not become a monopoly in the region after acquiring Thrifty Foods rival Safeway.

References

Online grocers
Online retailers of Canada
Sobeys
Supermarkets of Canada
Retail companies established in 1977
Food and drink companies based in British Columbia
Saanich Peninsula
1977 establishments in British Columbia
2007 mergers and acquisitions